The brothers Josse Beyens and Cornelio Beyens, born respectively in 1666 and 1672 in a merchant family of Merxem near Antwerp, left to establish themselves in Cadiz in Spain at the end of the 17th century. They were the sons of Josse Beyens.

The origins 
The family Beyens had many connexions with the parish church of St Bartholomew in Merksem. In its archives are to be found some members of the family Beyens. In the 17th century appears Lucia Beyens, married to Thomas Bogaerts. They wrote their wills on 5 May 1653.  There was also Joannes Beyens, who was sacristan and schoolmaster between 1673 and 1695. Also Joos Beyens, who between 1681 and 1703 exercised the craft of cartwright.
 
Josef Beyens was baptized on 17 April 1639 in the parish church of Merksem. He was the son of Juan Beyens and Petronela van Beren.  On 19 July 1662 he married Anna Torrekens in Wijnegem and they had three children: Anna, José en Cornelio Beyens. Josef Beyens died on 8 February 1698 in Merksem.

Great merchants in Cadiz 
Cornelio Beyens was born in Merksem in 1672 and died in Cádiz in 1736 or 1737. In 1693 he left Flanders and lived for two years in Madrid. He had previously been in contact with the merchant family Huwijn in Bruges, of whom one was established in Cadiz.  In 1695 he moved to Cádiz. On 3 May 1699 he married María Bruggemans in Cádiz.

Cornelio Beyens and also his elder brother Josse, were established as merchants in Cadiz and became rapidly amongst the most prosperous families of this town. Cornelio was Consul of the Flemish Nation in Cadiz.

Entry into nobility 
His sons Lorenzo, Rafael and Alejandro Beyens saw their nobility "recognized" by the Royal Chancellery of Grenade on August 8, 1766, based on the presentation of a false genealogy approved by the heraldry services in Brussels, making them the descendants of the noble family Beyens de Grambais.

On 3 December 1773, Charles III of Spain granted Lorenzo the hereditary titles of Count of Villamar and Viscount of San Lorenzo. Five years later, Lorenzo Beyens reached an important political situation by becoming Sindico Personero, that is to say "representative of the people" of the town of Cadiz and on July 14, 1779, he was admitted in the Order of Charles III. Being given the social status which they had reached, the Beyens had to give up their lucrative commercial activities. Lorenzo Josef and Josef Maria, sons of Lorenzo Beyens, thus became officers in the Walloon Guards, a popular regiment among Flemish émigrés established in Spain. This branch of the Beyens family remained in Cadiz and gave soldiers and engineers until the 20th century.

Bibliography 
 Wout Van Putten, De familie Beyens, een Vlaams-Gaditaanse handelaarsfamilie in de 18de eeuw. History of this family.
 Arturo y Alberto García Carraffa, Enciclopedia Hispanoamericana de Heráldica, Genealogía y Onomástica.
 Fernando González Doria, Diccionario Heráldico y Nobiliario de los Reinos de España.

Notes 

Spanish families